Anthony Florian Madinger Willich (died February 1804) was a German medical writer.

He specialized in diet, nutrition and other aspects of personal medicine.

Life
He was born at Rössel, Ermland, East Prussia (now Reszel, Kętrzyn County, Warmia, Poland). He lived in London for a period of time and was admitted as a Freemason in 1800 while living in Paddington, London. He died in 1804 in Kharkiv.

Career
He was a contemporary of Johann Christoph Adelung, with whom he frequently collaborated.

He is most famous for being the author of the Domestic Encyclopedia.

Bibliography
Some of his books and papers are:
 Elements of the critical philosophy 
 Lectures on Diet and Regimen
 Three Philological Essays 
 The Domestic Encyclopaedia

References

External links
 
 

German medical writers
1804 deaths
Year of birth missing
19th-century German non-fiction writers
German male non-fiction writers
19th-century German male writers
German Freemasons
People from Kętrzyn County